Tomas Nydahl (born 21 March 1968) is a former professional tennis player from Sweden. He reached a career high singles ranking of world No. 72 in 1998.  He managed to beat players such as Thomas Muster, Marcelo Ríos, Tim Henman, Tommy Haas, Petr Korda. He won 12 Challenger Tournaments and finished runner-up at 3 doubles Tour events. Nydahl achieved a career-high world best doubles ranking of world No. 103 in May 1989.

ATP career finals

Doubles: 3 (3 runner-ups)

ATP Challenger and ITF Futures finals

Singles: 11 (7–4)

Doubles: 15 (6–9)

Performance timelines

Singles

Doubles

External links
 
 

Swedish male tennis players
Sportspeople from Linköping
1968 births
Living people
Sportspeople from Östergötland County
20th-century Swedish people